The 2006 Volta a Catalunya was the 86th edition of the Volta a Catalunya cycling race took place from 15 May to 21 May 2006, in Catalonia. The race began in Salou with an individual time trial and ended in Barcelona. The race was won by David Cañada of Spain.

Teams
Twenty-five teams of up to eight riders started the race:

 
 
 
 
 
 
 
 
 
 
 
 
 
 
 
 
 
 
 
 
 
 
 Kaiku
 
 3 Molinos Resort

Route

Stages

Stage 1
15 May 2006 – Salou,  (ITT)

The stage was an individual time trial.

Stage 2
16 May 2006 – Cambrils,

Stage 3
17 May 2006 – Salou to Sant Carles de la Ràpita,

Stage 4
18 May 2006 – Perafort to Vallnord,

Stage 5
19 May 2006 – Llívia to Manlleu,

Stage 6
20 May 2006 – Manlleu to Lloret de Mar,

Stage 7
21 May 2006: Lloret de Mar to Barcelona,

Classification tables

General classification

Mountains classification

Points classification

Best team

References

External links
Race website

2006
Volta
2006 in Spanish road cycling
2006 UCI ProTour
May 2006 sports events in Europe